Banking in Greece made up the relative majority of assets and liabilities of Greece as of 2008.
On 29 June 2015 banks were shut down and capital controls were imposed. As of October 2018, the capital controls were brought to an end.

Greek banks are de facto owned by Eurozone countries through the Hellenic Financial Stability Fund, effectively a subsidiary of the EFSF/ESM administered by the Eurogroup outside official European Union institutions.

See also 
 List of banks in Greece
 Economy of Greece

References

External links 
 List of largest Greek banks